Psilochorus simoni is a species of cellar spider in the family Pholcidae. It is found in the United States, has been introduced into Europe, Turkey, and New Zealand.

The species gained its name "Wine Cellar Spider" after typically being found in wine cellars. Today, this species happily thrives in garden centres and greenhouses - creating a tidy, dome shaped web.

References

External links

 

Pholcidae
Articles created by Qbugbot
Spiders described in 1911